The following is a list of wars involving Serbia in the late modern period and contemporary history.

The list gives the name, the date, combatants, and the result of these conflicts following this legend:



List

See also
List of wars involving Serbia in the Middle Ages

Footnotes

 
 
Serbia
Serbia history-related lists
Serbian military-related lists